The Torre dello Sperone is a medieval tower in Cagliari, southern Sardinia, Italy. It is located in the Stampace historical quarter of the city.

The tower was part of the city's fortifications built in white limestone by the Pisan in the 13th century. A Latin inscription on the facade of the tower state that the tower was completed in March 1293 during the government of the Captain of the people Alberti.

Sources
Giancarlo Sorgia. Cagliari. La suggestione delle epigrafi. Cagliari, Edizioni della Torre, 1993. 

Towers completed in the 13th century
Towers in Cagliari
Buildings and structures in Cagliari